John Daka (born December 7, 1997) is an American football linebacker for the Houston Roughnecks of the XFL. He played college football at James Madison University. He was the first player of Zambian descent to sign with a National Football League team.

College career
Daka enrolled at James Madison University despite interest from FBS schools and got off to a slow start to his career with 23 tackles and one sack over his first two seasons. He led the Football Championship Subdivision with 16.5 sacks and 28 tackles for loss in the 2019 season and was named to the All-Colonial Athletic Association first-team. He played in 51 games for the Dukes, totaling 137 tackles, 47.5 tackles for losses, 27.5 sacks, four pass defenses, six forced fumbles and one fumble recovery.

Professional career

Baltimore Ravens
Daka was signed by the Baltimore Ravens as an undrafted free agent on May 6, 2020. He was waived during final roster cuts on August 31, 2020.

New York Jets
On January 12, 2021, Daka signed a reserve/future contract with the New York Jets. He was waived on May 3, 2021.

Los Angeles Rams
On May 4, 2021, Daka was claimed off waivers by the Los Angeles Rams. He was waived on August 31, 2021.

Chicago Bears
On January 6, 2022, Daka was signed to the Chicago Bears practice squad.

Houston Roughnecks 
On November 17, 2022, Daka was drafted by the Houston Roughnecks of the XFL.

References

Further reading

1997 births
Living people
African-American players of American football
American football linebackers
James Madison Dukes football players
Baltimore Ravens players
New York Jets players
Los Angeles Rams players
Chicago Bears players
Houston Roughnecks players
21st-century African-American sportspeople